John Meyers (June 28, 1880 – February 1975) was an American freestyle swimmer and water polo player who competed in the 1904 Summer Olympics in St. Louis, Missouri.  In the 1904 Olympics he won a bronze medal as a member of the Missouri Athletic Club water polo team. He also competed in one-mile freestyle, but did not finish the competition.

References

External links
profile

1880 births
1971 deaths
American male freestyle swimmers
American male water polo players
Olympic bronze medalists for the United States in water polo
Olympic swimmers of the United States
Swimmers at the 1904 Summer Olympics
Water polo players at the 1904 Summer Olympics
Medalists at the 1904 Summer Olympics